Zakham may refer to:

 Zakham (1989 film), an Indian Hindi-language film
 Zakham (1994 film), a Maldivian film
 Zakham (TV series), a 2017 Pakistani drama series